The ROH World Tag Team Championship is a professional wrestling world tag team championship owned by the Ring of Honor (ROH) promotion; it is contested for in their tag team division. The championship was created and debuted on September 21, 2002, at ROH's Unscripted event. At said event, the championship was represented by a trophy, which was destroyed by American Dragon & Michael Modest after they were defeated by The Prophecy (Christopher Daniels & Donovan Morgan), who had just become the inaugural champions. Daniels and Morgan were awarded physical belts later in 2002. Originally called the ROH Tag Team Championship, the title was renamed to the ROH World Tag Team Championship in July 2006 after the title was defended in Japan for the first time earlier that month, when then-champions, Austin Aries & Roderick Strong, defeated Naruki Doi & Masato Yoshino to retain the championship.

Title reigns are determined either by professional wrestling matches between different wrestlers involved in pre-existing scripted feuds, plots, and storylines, or by scripted circumstances. Wrestlers were portrayed as either villains or heroes as they followed a series of tension-building events, which culminated in a wrestling match or series of matches for the championship. Reigns that were won on pay-per-view events aired on tape delay up to weeks or months apart. Reigns that were won at live events were released on DVD. Title changes that occurred on ROH's primary television program, Ring of Honor Wrestling, air up to three to five weeks apart.

The inaugural champions were The Prophecy (Daniels & Morgan), whom ROH recognized to have become the champions after defeating American Dragon & Michael Modest on September 21, 2002, at ROH's Unscripted event in the final of a one-night tournament.

The Briscoe Brothers (Jay Briscoe & Mark Briscoe) were the most recent champions, however Jay died in a car accident on January 17, 2023.  The titles were formally vacated on March 8, 2023 on AEW Rampage (aired March 10), with new champions to be crowned in a Reach For the Sky ladder match on March 31, 2023 at Supercard of Honor

ROH publishes a list of defenses for each champion on their official website, unlike most other professional wrestling promotions. The Briscoe Brothers' second, third, and sixth reigns, Dan Maff's and B. J. Whitmer's first reign, The Second City Saints' (CM Punk & Colt Cabana) first reign, The Backseat Boyz (Trent Acid & Johnny Kashmere) only reign and the Forever Hooligans' only reign are all tied for the least defenses, with zero. At 441 days, The Foundation's (Jay Lethal & Jonathan Gresham) first reign is the longest in the title's history. Overall, there have been 64 reigns among 65 different wrestlers and 38 different teams.

Title history

Names

Reigns

Combined reigns

By team

By wrestler

Notes

1. This event was a live event that was later released on DVD.
2. Dan Maff's and B. J. Whitmer's first reign was won while they were in the alliance The Prophecy, while their second was won while they were no longer involved.
3. The Kings of Wrestling's (Chris Hero and Claudio Castagnoli) fourth defense is not recognized by ROH because it was defended at a Combat Zone Wrestling event, which was not sanctioned by ROH.
4. This event was a pay-per-view that later aired on tape delay.
5. Each reign is ranked highest to lowest; reigns with the exact number mean they are tied for that certain rank

References
General

Specific

External links
 ROH World Tag Team Title History at Cagematch.net

Ring of Honor championships
Professional wrestling tag team champion lists